A rat king is a collection of rats whose tails are intertwined and bound together in some way. This may be a result of an entangling material like hair, a sticky substance such as sap or gum, or the tails being tied together. Historically, this phenomenon is particularly associated with Germany. 

A similar phenomenon with squirrels has been observed, which has had modern documented examples.

Etymology 
The term was not originally used in reference to actual rats, but for persons who lived off others. Martin Luther stated: "finally, there is the Pope, the king of rats right at the top." Later, the term referred to a king sitting on a throne of knotted tails.

History 

The earliest report of rat kings comes from 1564. Most extant examples are formed from black rats (Rattus rattus).

Specimens of purported rat kings are kept in some museums. The museum Mauritianum in Altenburg, Thuringia, shows the largest well-known mummified "rat king", which was found in 1828 in a miller's fireplace at Buchheim. It consists of 32 rats. Alcohol-preserved rat kings are shown in museums in Hamburg, Göttingen, Hamelin, Stuttgart, Strasbourg and Nantes.

A rat king found in 1930 in New Zealand, displayed in the Otago Museum in Dunedin, was composed of immature black rats whose tails were entangled by horse hair.

A rat king discovered in 1963 by a farmer at Rucphen, Netherlands, as published by cryptozoologist M. Schneider, consists of seven rats. All of them were killed by the time they were examined. X-ray images show formations of callus at the fractures of their tails, which suggests that the animals survived for an extended period of time with their tails tangled.

Sightings of the phenomenon in modern times, especially where the specimens are alive, are very rare. One 2005 sighting comes from an Estonian farmer in Saru, of the Võrumaa region; many of the rats in the specimen, now part of the collection at the University of Tartu Museum of Zoology in Estonia, were alive. In 2021, a living "rat king" of five mice was caught on video (and untangled to save the mice) near Stavropol, Russia.

On October 20, 2021, a live rat king of 13 rats was found in Põlvamaa, Estonia. The rat king was brought to Tartu University and humanely euthanized because the rats had no way of freeing themselves. Before that, scientists were able to film the rat king alive. The rat king will be added to the Tartu University Museum of Zoology collection.

Squirrel kings

Instances of squirrel kings have been reported. They were found alive in some cases, and veterinarians have had to separate them as the squirrels could potentially starve or be eaten by a predator. A squirrel king of six squirrels stuck together with pine sap was found in Regina, Saskatchewan, Canada in June 2013. In 2018, five juvenile grey squirrels were found in Wisconsin, US. Some surrounding nest material, grass, and plastic got further entangled with them. The knot caused some tissue damage to their tails.

Possible explanations 
Rat kings have been reported from Germany, Belgium, Estonia, Java, and New Zealand, with the majority of cases reported from the European countries. The existence of this phenomenon is debated due to the limited evidence of it occurring naturally, although the discovery of a live instance in Estonia in 2021 is considered to be proof that it is a natural, albeit extremely rare, phenomenon. Another concern is the possibility that some of the centuries-old preserved museum specimens could be fabricated, such hoaxes being common in earlier eras. 17th–18th-century naturalists proposed many hypotheses to explain this phenomenon. Most were dubious, ranging from the rats getting stuck together during birth and glued later, to healthy rats deliberately knotting themselves to weaker rats to make a nest. A possible explanation is that the long flexible tail of the black rat could be exposed to sticky or frozen substances such as sebum (a secretion from the skin itself), sap, food, or excretory products. This mixture acts as a bonding agent and may solidify as rats sleep especially when the animals live in proximity during winter. After realizing that they were bound, they would struggle, tightening the knot. This explanation is plausible given that most cases have been found during winter and in confined spaces. Emma Burns, curator of natural science at the Otago Museum, said regarding her museum's specimen, "Ship rats [black rats], according to some theories, are climbing rats, so their tails have … a grasping reflex. In the nest, they form a hold."

Some zoologists remain skeptical, saying that, while theoretically possible, the rats would not be able to survive in such a condition for a long time, particularly if the temperatures rose or if they bit their own or another's tail to try to free themselves. Since black rats cluster together during winters for warmth, it could be possible for a rat king to be naturally-occurring. Any fabrications would most likely have been created using dead rats, given how difficult the process would be if the rats were alive. However, experts support the idea of isolated freak accidents due to the existence of occasional well-observed cases involving squirrels—also members of the rodent family. A 2007 study published in Proceedings of the Estonian Academy of Science, Biology, and Ecology, following the finding of the University of Tartu specimen, concluded that the phenomenon is possible but rare.

In popular culture

Rat kings appear in novels such as It by Stephen King, Accordion Crimes by Annie Proulx, The Tale of One Bad Rat by Bryan Talbot, Ratking by Michael Dibdin, Rotters by Daniel Kraus, Peeps by Scott Westerfeld, The Haunting of Alaizabel Cray by Chris Wooding, Rats and Gargoyles by Mary Gentle, Luther: The Calling by Neil Cross, The War for the Lot by Sterling E. Lanier, Cold Storage by David Koepp, where it plays a prominent role, and The Rats by James Herbert. The Lorrie Moore short story Wings features a couple who discover a rat king in their attic. In Alan Moore and Ian Gibson's comic book series The Ballad of Halo Jones, the Rat King was a weapon of war, a super-intelligent collective able to coordinate attacks by regular rats on a global scale, decimating an entire planet.

In The Amazing Maurice and his Educated Rodents by Terry Pratchett, Keith skeptically notes that the filth associated with supposedly tying the young rats together at a young age is not found in a rat's nest, and suspects that a rat king is created as a sort of project by a rat catcher himself. One rat king, called Spider due to having eight component rats, supports this by his grudge against humanity for his traumatic creation. In an author's note at the end of the novel, Pratchett ventures the theory that "down the ages, some cruel and inventive people have had altogether too much time on their hands".

E. T. A. Hoffmann's The Nutcracker and the Mouse King features a "Mouse King" with seven heads, seemingly inspired by the multiple-bodied rat king. The character is typically depicted as multi-headed in productions of the Tchaikovsky ballet The Nutcracker, based on the novella. The film The Nutcracker and the Four Realms, based on the short story, similarly features a "Mouse King", a rat-king like creature formed from a teeming mass of small mice.

In the eleventh episode of the sixth season of Teen Wolf, "Said the Spider to the Fly", Liam Dunbar and Mason Hewitt encounter a rat king. The sixth episode of the first season of 30 Rock, "Jack Meets Dennis", Dennis Duffy claims to have seen a rat king. Later, Liz Lemon describes what her future with Dennis would be like, becoming "more and more tangled up in each other's lives until [she] can't even get away," and realizes that he is a metaphorical rat king. An episode of the NBC TV urban fantasy series Grimm featured a monstrous, bipedal Rat King loose in Portland, formed by multiple 'Rienegen' (were-rats) conjoining their body mass. An episode of the Netflix TV show Hilda, "The Nightmare Spirit", featured a large rat king with glowing red eyes made of an unknown number of rats. This character is a peddler of secrets, willing to trade gossip with anyone who will tell him something worthy.

The phenomenon's name appeared as the title of a Boston Manor song released in 2020. When asked about it, vocalist Henry Cox explained that he used the rat king as a metaphor for current political and social events.

In the mission A Sinking Ship in the video game Shadowrun: Hong Kong, a massive rat king held together by a magical amulet known as "the shiny object" is fought at the end of the mission.  Gobbet, a shaman of the rat totem, is eventually able to grab the shiny object and disperse the rat king.

A creature known as the Rat King is featured in the 2020 action-adventure video game The Last of Us Part II. It is an amalgam of multiple infected humans which appears halfway through the plot, when protagonist Abby explores the underground levels of a hospital in Seattle which were ground zero for the outbreak in the city over 20 years before. Three actors were tied together to perform motion capture for the creature. Co-director Kurt Margenau described the idea behind the Rat King as the team's take on "what happens to them [the infected] when they sit around for a really long time."

See also 

 Ant mill

References

External links

  Photo and X-ray of rat king in the Museum of Nantes 

Rats